Mackendrick is a surname. Notable people with the surname include:

Alexander Mackendrick (1912–1993), Scottish American director and teacher
Paul MacKendrick (1914–1998), American classicist, author and teacher

See also
MV Empire MacKendrick, grain ship converted to become a Merchant Aircraft Carrier or MAC ship

de:Mackendrick